Jalan Muar–Labis (Johor state route J32) is a major road in Johor, Malaysia. It connects the town of Bukit Trehin Muar to Labis via the Muar Bypass. It is also a main route to North–South Expressway Southern Route via Pagoh Interchange.

Route background
Jalan Muar–Labis starts at Labis.

History
Originally, the road was only paved from Muar to Lenga and another section near Labis; however, the road was fully paved in the 1970s as a result of the opening of many FELDA settlements along Labis–Lenga stretch.

Features

Notable features 
Main route to North–South Expressway Southern Route via Pagoh Interchange
Bandar Universiti Pagoh
Bukit Kepong, the historical town during Malayan Emergency (1948–1960)

At most sections, the Johor State Route J32 was built under the JKR R5 road standard, with a speed limit to 90 km/h.

Alternate routes
Pagoh Jaya bypass

List of junctions

References

Roads in Johor